KDWB-FM (101.3 MHz) is an American commercial radio station broadcasting in the Twin Cities region of Minnesota, licensed to suburban Richfield. KDWB's radio format is Top 40/CHR. Its transmitter is located in Shoreview, while its studios are in St. Louis Park. The station is owned by iHeartMedia.

History
Between its AM and FM frequencies, KDWB has been an uninterrupted Top 40 outlet since 1959. Originally starting out at 630 kHz, the station's owners (Doubleday Broadcasting of Garden City, New York) purchased the 101.3 MHz frequency in 1976, later transferring the entire format there.

63 KDWB

KDWB's origins on the AM dial date back to 1951, at 1590kHz. The station began as a collaboration between three brothers who named it WCOW, and it played country western and old-time music. In the early days, WCOW, which was licensed to South St. Paul (its original city of license), signed on with a cowbell. The studios, transmitter, broadcast towers and offices were located at 255 Radio Drive South in Woodbury. In 1949, the three brothers, Al, Vic, and Nick Tedesco applied to the Federal Communications Commission for the purchase of WSHB in Stillwater. The application was approved, on March 15, 1949; WAVN in Stillwater signed on the air as a 5,000 watt non-directional Day-Timer with 500-watt pre-sunrise authority. The Tedesco brothers attempted to get into television on channel 17 the next year, but financial backing fell through. (The channel 17 allocation was taken by Twin Cities Public Television in 1965.) Since the initial purchase of WAVN in 1949, the Tedesco brothers acquired and/or sold several other radio stations, spanning over 50 years, sometimes with partners. On April 18, 1994, after 36 years, the 630kHz frequency went dark. The owners, Midcontinent Media, sold the property, and the state of the art facilities were dismantled, salvaged and/or destroyed to make room for the construction of the-then State Farm Insurance Companies regional headquarters.

WCOW was not very successful, so the station transitioned to being a female-oriented station including commercials aimed at its target audience, with a heavy saturation of long term ad contract, with the call letters changing to WISK in 1957, and switched its frequency to 630kHz the next year. Again, the format was not popular, and the station was sold the following year to Crowell-Collier Broadcasting Company, owners of KFWB in Los Angeles and KEWB in San Francisco. The top 40 format of those stations, with strong California/West Coast style influence, was brought to Minnesota, and the call letters changed to KDWB in 1959. "Channel 63, KDWB" then began its long uninterrupted run as a pop music station, and quickly became a major competitor to the established WDGY, which had been playing a pop music format for three years by that point. KDWB and WDGY were fierce rivals throughout the 1960s and 1970s; during that time, both stations gained more competition, as "Request Radio" AM 950 and FM 104.1 KRSI (1968), KSTP (1972), and WYOO (1974) picked up the format.

KDWB also held the distinction of being the first radio station ever to be fined by the Federal Communications Commission. In March 1961, six months after a review to the Communications Act of 1934 granted it such power, the agency assessed a $10,000 penalty to the station because of repeated willful violations of nighttime broadcast power restrictions on the AM band.

On-air staff and other programming
During the 1960s and 1970s, Program Director Chuck Blore referred to the seven air shifts in 24 hours as "The 7 Swinging Gentlemen". They included:
 "True" Don Bleu
 Bob Shannon
 Lou Reigert (Lou Waters)

Syndicated and/or non-local originating broadcasts included American Top 40 with Casey Kasem, which aired Sunday evenings, and for over ten years, it was the highest-rated program in the Twin Cities market. Additional syndicated programming included "Jim Ladd's Innerview."

Program Directors included Chuck Blore and Bob Shannon.

History of 101.3 FM
101.3 FM began broadcasting on July 18, 1960, as WPBC-FM, simulcasting daytime-only WPBC (980 AM) and broadcasting at night. Four years later, the Stewarts were approved to move both stations from Minneapolis to Richfield, increase the AM's power to 5 kW, and begin broadcasting at night. In 1969, the AM and FM stopped simulcasting; the FM retained the "good music" format, while the AM shifted even further to middle-of-the-road. The studios, transmitters (both AM and FM), towers and offices were located at the intersection of Cliff Road and Cedar Avenue (presently "Nichols Road"), in Eagan.

The Stewarts, citing increased competition from larger companies, sold WPBC-AM-FM in 1972 to Fairchild Industries for $1.5 million. Fairchild subsequently dismissed the entire staff and overhauled both stations. On November 3, 1972, WPBC became WYOO, airing an oldies format, while WPBC-FM went off the air for technical adjustments, to emerge as album-oriented rock station WRAH on January 23, 1973.

After debuting to middling ratings that then continually declined, WYOO went in a new direction in April 1974, spearheaded by new general manager Mike Sigelman, the former sales manager of KDWB. A shift to an adult contemporary was met with even lower ratings; with management seeing a gap for a Top 40 station on FM, both stations flipped on August 26, 1974, during a remote broadcast from the Minnesota State Fair. The new "U100"—intended to be "Y100", only for WHYI in Miami to order them to cease and desist—quickly became a competitive station in the market.

U100 was not to last forever. The AM dial in the Twin Cities was crowded with top 40 stations, with U100, KDWB, WDGY and KSTP all fighting for the same audience.  AM music stations also desired to transition to the increasingly popular FM dial. In early 1976, Fairchild Industries decided to put both stations on the market. Entertainment Communications, Inc., the owner of easy listening station WAYL (93.7 FM), was interested in the AM station to simulcast WAYL's signal, but it could not buy a second FM station in the market under the rules of the time. This meant that Fairchild needed to find a buyer for the FM station; the company sought out the owners of various AM stations in the area. Doubleday Broadcasting, owner of KDWB, was not actively seeking an FM station at the time, but offered to buy WYOO-FM in February 1976 after it was offered a rather generous deal that included the FM station and the building in Eagan that housed both stations for $850,000. KDWB's general manager at the time, Gary Stevens, said that it did not buy WYOO-FM to shut down a competitor, but rather to take advantage of what it saw as a good deal. The AM station was then sold to WAYL for $625,000.

"U100" signed off for the last time at midnight on September 15, 1976, and under PD John Sebastian, KDWB morning personality Dave Thomson launched the KDWB AM/FM simulcast the following morning at 6:00 with "Bad Blood" by Neil Sedaka as the first song played following the pre-recorded piece announcing the change. Continuous AM and FM simulcasts in large markets (stations licensed to cities with populations over 100,000) were not allowed by the FCC since 1965.  However, KDWB's simulcast was permitted under the terms, conditions and FCC rules of the time via a conditional waiver and a technicality: while the AM was licensed to St. Paul (a community of over 100,000), the FM's city of license, Richfield, did not have that large of a population.  The FCC deemed the request to be in the public interest; however, KDWB was required by the FCC to broadcast eight hours of separate FM non-simulcast public affairs programming per week, with a portion focused on Richfield. The public affairs programs were broadcast from the former WYOO studio B news room and master control board in Eagan.

Helped by the stereo simulcast on 101.3 FM and the removal of one of its competitors, KDWB quickly regained its position as the dominant Top 40 station in the Twin Cities. After a brief stint with a CHR/album rock hybrid as "Y-11", WDGY switched to a country format on September 2, 1977. KSTP began to lean Adult Top 40 during the late 1970s and evolved into a talk station by the early 1980s (as its music focus shifted to FM sister, KS95). By the end of the decade, KDWB was the only ongoing Top 40 station in town.

Stereo 101
With the active competition gone, KDWB-FM split apart from the AM station's Top 40 simulcast in September 1979, and became a pop/rock hybrid as "K101 FM", with a new separate air-staff. K101 FM was met with mixed reviews and less than hoped for ratings in the Fall 1979 Arbitron ratings.  KDWB management opted for a change between the last week of December 1979 and New Year's 1980, by replacing the Program Director. The station immediately morphed into "Stereo 101, The Twin Cities Rockin' Best", then "KDWB Twin Cities' 101, The Home Of Rock 'N' Roll", and then "Real Rock 101 KDWB", an album rock station designed to go up against KQ92, which had recently dumped its freeform rock presentation and adopted a stricter playlist in reaction to a drop in ratings.  Stereo 101 would be successful in its four-year run, topping KQRS in the Arbitron ratings many times, but KQRS would endure and prevail.  By the summer 1983, KDWB-FM began to move from album rock to a pop/rock hybrid again, and eventually evolved into CHR the following year.  KDWB's AM signal continued with the Top 40 format during this time, although it softened to adult contemporary in 1984.

Back to Top 40
In December 1981, a serious new Top 40 competitor arrived in the Twin Cities, when WLOL dropped its soft rock format and turned itself into a high-profile hit music station (heavy with power pop and new wave), immediately shooting to the top of the ratings. At the other end of the spectrum, KS95 gravitated toward Adult Top 40. Around this time, WCCO-FM also briefly switched to Top 40. Meanwhile, 63 KDWB faded quickly in the ratings, as AM music stations were slowly becoming a thing of the past. To protect its heritage, take a chunk of WLOL's stellar ratings, and finally make the move of its legendary station to the FM dial, in early 1984, KDWB-FM reverted to the Top 40 simulcast as "The New KDWB FM 101", and then as "All Hit 101". Even though the AM station was running its own programming at times, in a role reversal, the FM signal was now deemed the priority, as 630 AM attained secondary status. The AM station aired a CHR format identical to its FM counterpart from fall 1984 to spring 1986, before it flipped to a separate satellite delivered Oldies format as "K63" in May 1986. In August 1991, 630 AM took on the WDGY call letters of their former Top 40 rival on 1130 AM.

KDWB-FM struggled for years against upstart market leader WLOL, which featured a fresher music selection, more popular DJs, and a highly rated morning show. KDWB was viewed by many as stuffy, stale, boring and misguided, and it went through several unsuccessful morning shows. It was argued by many that its promotions, music selection and on-air presentation paled in comparison to WLOL.

In 1988, newly hired program director Brian Phillips cleaned house, as he dismissed many of the on-air personalities, overhauled the music and brought in Steve Cochran to host The KDWB Morning Zoo. He also hired a new air staff, introduced 12-song commercial-free music sweeps, changed the overall on-air presentation, and created a new logo, which is still in use today. As the rechristened "101.3 KDWB", its fortunes changed, with KDWB quickly becoming the dominant Top 40/CHR station in the market. Now, WLOL was playing catch-up, as it tried various minor overhauls and tweaks before moving in a Rhythmic-oriented direction in 1990.

KDWB also gained national attention in 1989 for helping to break "The Look" by Roxette, the first of four U.S. number-one songs for the Swedish duo. In February 1991, WLOL came to a sudden and premature end, as owner Emmis Broadcasting experienced financial problems and began to divest of many of its properties. Minnesota Public Radio purchased WLOL and turned it into the flagship for their classical music service. Throughout the rest of the 1990s, KDWB had virtually no CHR competition.

In 2000, KDWB got a new rival of sorts when upstart KTTB ("B96") went on the air with a rhythmic Top 40 format, heavy with hip-hop and urban contemporary music. While B96 was not the threat of a major rating, partly due to its rimshot broadcast signal and smaller promotional presence, it did give KDWB the most formidable competition it had in recent years. Later, the competition for the rhythmic/urban audience came from KZGO, sister station to the former B96.

At the other end of the spectrum, KS95 also competes somewhat with its older-leaning Hot AC format (which has since transitioned to a more younger-leaning direction), as does KDWB's own sister station KTCZ, with its own pop/rock-leaning Hot AC presentation. In 2010, KTTB rebranded as KHTC, leaning more towards KDWB's format, and relocated their transmitter to the heart of the metro area. The battle between KDWB and KHTC lasted until New Year's Day 2012, when KHTC flipped to Modern AC to fill the void left open by WLTE's flip to Country, thus leaving KDWB as the market's only mainstream Top 40 outlet again.

HD Radio
On April 25, 2006, Clear Channel Communications (now iHeartMedia), announced that KDWB's HD2 subchannel will carry a format focusing on dance hits. The HD2 signed the following July as the Party Zone. "Party Zone" is also the name of the Friday and Saturday night show on KDWB simulcasted from local clubs that in the past has been hosted by the likes of Tone E. Fly, Gerry Dixon and Michael Knight. After six months of running jockless, the subchannel began to add announcers (from KDWB) to its programming.

In 2010, the Party Zone format began broadcasting on K273BH, its FM translator at 102.5, which covers the area. They were one of two outlets in the Clear Channel roster that did not use the Club Phusion Dance format, as this one featured a live presentation over the air. The other one is KXJM Portland, Oregon, who launched "Too Wild HD2" in January 2012, customized for that market.

On April 29, 2013, the Party Zone format was dropped in favor of an Adult Contemporary format. In e-mails exchanged with the KDWB programming director, it was discovered that ultimately the station will air "songs recorded in Studio C from Cities 97", which began on July 15, 2013.

In 2017, KDWB-HD2 changed to iHeart's "Trancid" format.

In May 2018, the station activated an HD3 sub-channel, and began airing an adult hits format as "Minnesota State Fair Radio".

After KQQL-HD3/K244FE dropped the "Pride Radio" format and flipped to sports talk as "KFAN Plus" in August 2018, the "Pride Radio" format moved to KDWB-HD2.

On November 16, 2018, KDWB-HD3 briefly switched to KQQL's classic hits format (while KQQL made its annual flip to Christmas music that same day). However, on November 30, KDWB-HD3 switched to a country format branded as "The Bull 101.3-HD3." Gregg Swedberg, program director and operations manager of sister KEEY, says that the "Bull" format "just plays country music, with no pop crossovers".

In May 2019, KDWB-HD3 reverted to its previous "Minnesota State Fair Radio" branding and Country/Adult Hits format.

Dave Ryan in the Morning
The Dave Ryan in the Morning show is KDWB's morning show. It has aired on KDWB since June 11, 1993.  Current hosts of the show are Dave Ryan (born October 24, 1962), Falen Bonsett (born April 6, 1984), Jenny, and Drake Webb.

Former morning show staff
Former morning show staff include:
 Lee Valsvik: (1993–2000) — now at sister station Kool 108 in Minneapolis/St. Paul
 Angi Taylor: (1998–2003)- now at WCHI Chicago
 Corey Foley: (2003–2007)
 Lena Svenson (2007–2011) — formerly on the Elvis Duran & the Morning Show in New York (2012-2018), using her real name, Bethany Watson. Filled in for Falen while she was on maternity leave.
 Intern John  (2007–2011) — now host of "Your Morning Show" on WIHT (HOT 99.5) in Washington DC
 Crisco (2002–2012) — now mornings at KSTP-FM in Minneapolis/St. Paul
 Pat Ebertz (Producer/Man in Charge) - now in sales for 92 KQRS-FM
 Jamie Guse ("Xtreme" Jamie))
 Steve "Steve-O" LaTart — Laid off in a wave of layoffs across iHeartMedia in 2020

See also

 KKMS (AM)
 WDGY
 WYOO (U100)

References

External links
 KDWB-FM official website
 Radiotapes.com Historic Minneapolis/St. Paul airchecks dating back to 1924 including KDWB AM & FM and other Twin Cities radio stations
 Twin Cities Radio Airchecks' KDWB page Historical recordings and photos of KDWB from the 1960s and 1970s
 Oldiesloon.com, featuring historical information of Twin Cities Top 40 stations
 Station histories Oldiesloon
 Barry Mishkind (February 28, 2004) Broadcast History FAQ The Broadcast Archive
 radiotapes.com, featuring classic airchecks of KDWB, KDWB-FM, U100, and "Stereo 101"

HD Radio stations
Contemporary hit radio stations in the United States
Radio stations established in 1959
IHeartMedia radio stations
Radio stations in Minnesota
1959 establishments in Minnesota